Seyyed Javad Zabihi (1931 – 15 July 1981) was a Persian traditional music singer and Muezzin. He was one of the most popular muezzins in the time of Mohammad Reza Pahlavi and a regular guest in radio Iran who was known for his right volume and deep and impressive tremolos. After the 1978 revolution, he was forced to retire from his profession. Some time later, he was imprisoned for his activities during the reign of Mohammad Reza Pahlavi, and was released in 1980, but the persecution did not end. Finally, in 1981, he was brutally murdered by Muslim Student Followers of the Imam's Line on the orders of Sadegh Khalkhali.

Life 
Seyyed Javad Zabihi was born in 1931. His father, Seyyed Esmaeil Zabihi Darkahi, praised the residents of Darakeh village, north of Tehran. He had been wearing a Fez since he was young, and although he had no formal education, he knew all the vocal lines well. He went to Golha in 1957 with Davood Pirnia and performed 60 programs there. His singing style was solo and without music, he played the instruments and then he sang alone. In 1968, a collection of poems selected by him entitled Heavenly Songs, which was a collection of his works on Radio Iran, was published in 165 pages with an introduction by Mohammad Mohit Tabatabai and published by Atai Publications. Zabihi had nationalist leanings and, like Khwaja Abdullah Ansari, emphasized reciting prayers in Persian.

References 

Iranian murder victims
Persian-language singers
Iranian folk singers
Singers from Tehran
1931 births
1981 deaths
Male singers on Golha